Glyphidoptera insignana is a moth of the family Tortricidae. It is known from Australia, including the Australian Capital Territory, Tasmania, New South Wales and Victoria.

The wingspan is about 15 mm. Adults have brown forewings, with a scattering of red spots with white outlines. There are two such large spots on the inner margin. In its natural resting position each of these spots appears to join up with the corresponding spot on the other forewing. The hindwings are plain pale brown with dark veins.

The larvae feed on Eucalyptus and Syncarpia species.

References

Archipini